Turov may refer to:
 Turov, Belarus, town in Belarus and the capital of the medieval Principality of Turov
Principality of Turov, medieval principality in the territory of modern southern Belarus and northern Ukraine
Turov (surname)

See also
Turów (disambiguation)